Chembukkavu Bhagavathy Temple is a Hindu temple situated in Chembukkavu, Thrissur city of Kerala, India. Cochin Devaswom Board controls the temple. It is one of the 108 Durga temples in Kerala. The temple is a participant in the Thrissur Pooram every year. 
The Bhagavathy at the Ayyanthole temple is considered to be the elder sister of the Chembukkavu Bhagavathy.

References

Hindu temples in Thrissur
Bhagavathi temples in Kerala
Durga temples
Thrissur Pooram